Long Gone Days is a dystopian role-playing video game for Windows, OSX and Linux, being developed by BURA. The original demo was written, developed, and illustrated by Camila Gormaz. It features the first hour of the story, and was released for Windows and OSX on May 13, 2016. The game was released on March 28, 2018.

In Long Gone Days, the player controls Rourke, a soldier from an underground unrecognized country named "The Core", after he is deployed to a mission in Kaliningrad, Russia. After discovering the truth about the operation he was part of, he decides to desert and find a way to prevent the upcoming war his homeland wants to provoke.

The demo received mostly positive reviews, praising its writing and art. Reviewers especially enjoyed the use of a Morale system to motivate other party members, and the topical issues covered by the plot.

Plot 
In an unofficial country named The Core, whose exact location is unknown, every individual is trained from birth for their job to become experts by adulthood. Rourke, a military sniper who has never visited the surface, is chosen as a last-minute replacement for an operation to aid the Polish forces in Kaliningrad, without much time to review the briefing.

After the mission of eliminating the targets they were assigned to, Rourke discovers all of them were civilians; and the squad's combat medic Adair reveals that it was actually a false flag operation. Rourke is appalled by their actions and by the fact nobody in his squad seems to mind the war crimes they are committing, so he decides to desert. Intrigued by his choice, Adair makes up his mind to follow Rourke along.

Taking advantage of his specialty, Adair reports a false illness that requires transferring Rourke to the nearest field hospital. They escape to the opposite direction of their two bases in Kaliningrad, but are quickly discovered after being spotted by drones and fellow soldiers from a nearby base they were unaware of; thus realizing the operation is much bigger than they were informed of.

The demo ends with Rourke and Adair being chased by their own allies, as they have become deserters and enemies of The Core, while they try to process what are they going to do with their lives from now on.

Gameplay 
Long Gone Days is a role-playing game with visual novel elements that uses a top-down perspective. It features a traditional turn-based RPG combat, which allows the player to select which body-part of the enemy to aim. Since the story doesn't have fantasy or supernatural elements, instead of magic, the characters rely on morale. This stat can be raised or lowered by the choices the player may choose during dialogues in and outside battles, and it affects how each party member will perform in battle. If their Morale reaches zero, the character loses their will to fight.

Besides the turn-based combats, the game also features a first-person sniper mode, which consists of seek and find mechanics.

Since the story is set in the real world, the NPCs will speak in their native language depending on the country the characters are in. The player can recruit interpreters in order to buy at shops and complete quests.

Development 
Long Gone Days was originally conceived in 2003 by Gormaz as an RPG Maker 2000 project, but it was not until 2015 that the development of the demo began. The game was announced for the first time on the RPG Maker forums and TIG Source on January 17, 2016. On May 13, the Windows version of the demo was released, and an OSX port was released on July 14.

On July 11, 2016, Gormaz launched a crowdfunding campaign on the website Indiegogo. The campaign reached its goal on August 11, 2016, ending with US$21,300 raised by 567 people. According to the developer, the game will be around 4 to 5 hours long, and it will have two different endings.

Reception 
The demo of Long Gone Days received overwhelmingly positive reviews from critics, mostly appreciating the art style and the story. It received a score of 4.7/5 on Game Jolt, based on 480 ratings, and 5/5 on Itch.io.

Reviewers praised the game's focus on the use of interpreters, with Maddi Chilton of Kill Screen commenting "Not only do they add realism to a game that deals with international military, but they bring into the spotlight something that people often forget: it's not only the soldiers shooting guns that are crucial to a war".

References

External links 

 Official website
 Official devlog
 Official twitter

Crowdfunded video games
Indie video games
Indiegogo projects
Linux games
MacOS games
Role-playing video games
Single-player video games
2018 video games
Video games developed in Chile
Windows games